Elections to Stirling Council were held on 5 May 2022, the same day as the 31 other local authorities in Scotland. The election used the seven wards created under the Local Governance (Scotland) Act 2004, with 23 councillors being elected. Each ward elected either 3 or 4 members, using the STV electoral system.

The election saw Scottish Labour increase their representation on the council by two and significantly increase their vote share. The SNP lost one seat and the Scottish Greens retained their single seat. The Scottish Conservatives saw their representation on the Council drop by two seats. The Scottish Liberal Democrats failed to win representation and one independent candidate won a seat.

2022 results

Note: "Votes" are the first preference votes. The net gain/loss and percentage changes relate to the result of the previous Scottish local elections on 4 May 2017. This may differ from other published sources showing gain/loss relative to seats held at dissolution of Scotland's councils.

Ward results

Trossachs and Teith
2017: 2xCon; 1xSNP
2022: 2xCon; 1xSNP
2017-2022: No change

Forth and Endrick
2017: 2xCon; 1xSNP
2022: 1xCon; 1xSNP; 1xLab
2017-2022 Change: 1 Lab gain from Con

Dunblane and Bridge of Allan
2017: 2xCon; 1xSNP; 1xGreen
2022: 1xCon; 1xSNP; 1xGreen; 1xLab
2017-2022 Change: 1 Lab gain from Con

Stirling North
2017: 2xSNP; 1xCon; 1xLab
2022: 2xSNP; 1xCon; 1xLab
2012-2017: No change

Stirling West
2012: 1xLab; 1xSNP; 1xCon
2017: 1xCon; 1xSNP; 1xLab
2012-2017 Change: No change

Stirling East
2017: 1xCon; 1xLab; 1xSNP
2022: 1xCon; 1xLab; 1xSNP
2017-2022: No change

Bannockburn
2017: 2xSNP; 1xLab
2022: 1xSNP; 1xLab; 1xInd
2017-2022 Change: 1 Ind gain from SNP

Notes

‡On 17 May 2017, Robert Davies (Forth and Endrick) was suspended from the Scottish Conservative party over potentially offensive Twitter posts. He was reinstated on 21 August 2017. However, on 29 September 2017, Robert Davies resigned from the Conservative group at a council meeting and subsequently had his Conservative party membership terminated. He ran as an independent in the 2022 election.

Aftermath
Despite the SNP winning the most seats, Labour formed a minority administration after the Conservatives voted in favour of it.

Changes since 2022
In October 2022, Labour councillor Ewan Dillon quit the party to become an independent. This reduced the ruling Labour administration to five councillors.

By-elections since 2022
A by-election was held in Dunblane and Bridge of Allan on 16 March 2023 following the death of SNP councillor Graham Houston.

References 

2022
Stirling